Welcome to the Dopehouse is the third studio album by American rap group the Dayton Family from Flint, Michigan. It was released on May 21, 2002, via Koch Records. The album peaked at number 107 on the Billboard 200 albums chart and at number 20 on the Top R&B/Hip-Hop Albums chart in the United States.

Track listing

Personnel
Ira "Bootleg" Dorsey – main artist
Raheen "Shoestring" Peterson – main artist
Brian Goldfish – featured artist (track 6)
Lori – featured artist (track 7)
Erick "Ghetto-E" Dorsey – featured artist (track 7)
Kalonda – featured artist (track 12)
Ryan – featured artist (track 12)
Steve Pitts – producer (tracks: 1-11, 13-16)
Gee Pierce – producer (track 12), engineering
Bernard Terry – mixing
Jeff Chenault – art direction & design

Chart history

References

External links 

Welcome to the Dopehouse by The Dayton Family on iTunes

2002 albums
The Dayton Family albums
E1 Music albums